Abell 31 is an ancient planetary nebula in the constellation of Cancer. It is estimated to be about 2,000 light years away. Although it is one of the largest planetary nebulae in the sky, it is not very bright.

The central star of the planetary nebula is a white dwarf with a spectral type of DAO.

References

http://www.astronomy-mall.com/Adventures.In.Deep.Space/abellcat.htm
http://observing.skyhound.com/archives/feb/PNG_219.1+31.2.html
https://web.archive.org/web/20140222225156/http://www.astrosurf.com/zoll/images/abell31
http://www.annesastronomynews.com/photo-gallery-ii/nebulae-clouds/abell-31-by-adam-block/

External links
http://www.space.com/14747-abell31-nebula-photo-skywatching.html

Abell 31
31
Cancer (constellation)